Roforofo Fight is an album by Nigerian Afrobeat composer, bandleader, and multi-instrumentalist Fela Kuti recorded in Lagos and originally released on the Nigerian EMI label Jofabro in 1972.

Track listing

All compositions by Fela Ransome Kuti.

1. "Roforofo Fight" – 15:40
2. "Trouble Sleep Yanga Wake Am" – 12:03
3. "Question Jam Answer" – 13:38
4. "Go Slow" – 17:22

 2001 CD reissue Roforofo Fight/The Fela Singles

1. "Roforofo Fight" – 15:42
2. "Go Slow" – 17:25
3. "Question Jam Answer" – 13:41
4. "Trouble Sleep Yanga Wake Am" – 12:06
5. "Shenshema" – 9:10
6. "Ariya" – 10:18
5 & 6 are from 7" singles also released in Nigeria in 1972 on His Master's Voice, with each song split between both sides.

Personnel

Fela Kuti – tenor saxophone, alto saxophone, vocals
Tunde Williams – trumpet
Christopher Uwaifor – tenor saxophone
Lekan Animashaun – baritone saxophone
Segun Edo, Tutu Shorunmu – guitar
George Bruce – bass guitar
Tony Allen – drums
James Abayomi – percussion

References

External links 

 

Fela Kuti albums
1972 albums
Afrobeat albums
Yoruba-language albums